FC Iskra Rîbnița is a Moldovan football club based in Rîbnița, Moldova. They play in the Divizia A, the second tier of Moldovan football.

External links
Profile at Soccerway
Profile at Vk

Football clubs in Moldova
Association football clubs established in 2013
2013 establishments in Moldova
Football clubs in Transnistria